Leon R. Tarver II (born c. 1948) is an American academic administrator. He served as the president of Southern University, a public, historically black university in Baton Rouge, Louisiana, from 1997 to 2005.

Early life and education
Tarver was born circa 1948 in Shreveport, Louisiana. He attended local schools before college. He earned a Bachelor of Arts degree in political science from Southern University Baton Rouge, a master's of public administration from Harvard University (John K. Kennedy School of Government), and a doctor of philosophy from The Union Institute in Cincinnati, Ohio.

Career
Tarver joined Southern University as a professor of Public Administration in 1992. He was the executive administrator of SU's Center of Cultural Heritage and International Programs. He served as its president from 1997 to 2005.

In addition, he has worked at international development in Haiti, England, France, and Africa, including Ghana, Mozambique, Nigeria, and South Africa. In 2013 Tarver was appointed to the Board of Trustees of Southern University by Governor Bobby Jindal. Since 2015, he has served as the chairman of SU's board.

Tarver was also the Secretary of the Louisiana Department of Revenue and Taxation.

Personal life
Tarver has a wife, Cynthia.

References

Living people
1940s births
People from Shreveport, Louisiana
Southern University alumni
Harvard Kennedy School alumni
Union Institute & University alumni
Southern University presidents
African-American academics
21st-century African-American people
20th-century African-American people